The name Calvin has been used for seven tropical cyclones in the Eastern Pacific Ocean.
 Tropical Storm Calvin (1981), briefly threatened Baja California Sur
 Tropical Storm Calvin (1987), did not make landfall
 Hurricane Calvin (1993), killed 37 people in Mexico
 Tropical Storm Calvin (1999), storm was over open waters so there were no reports of deaths or damage
 Tropical Storm Calvin (2005), briefly threatened Acapulco but moved away
 Hurricane Calvin (2011), stayed off the coast of Mexico
 Tropical Storm Calvin (2017), minimal tropical storm that made landfall in southwestern Mexico

Pacific hurricane set index articles